Club Deportiu Blanes is a football team based in Blanes, Catalonia, Spain. Founded in 1913, it plays in Segona Catalana. Its stadium is Estadi Municipal de Blanes.

Season to season

13 seasons in Tercera División

Current squad

External links
Official website

Football clubs in Catalonia
Association football clubs established in 1913
Divisiones Regionales de Fútbol clubs
1913 establishments in Spain